The bluebills are the genus Spermophaga  of the estrildid finches family. These birds are found in tropical Africa. They are gregarious seed eaters with short, thick, blue and red bills. All have plumage which is mainly crimson and black or dark grey.

Species
The members are:

References
Clement, Harris and Davis, Finches and Sparrows  

 
Estrildidae